Edermeg is a rural locality (a selo) in Kizhinginsky District, Republic of Buryatia, Russia. The population was 514 as of 2010. There are 7 streets.

Geography 
Edermeg is located 26 km southwest of Kizhinga (the district's administrative centre) by road. Leonovka is the nearest rural locality.

References 

Rural localities in Kizhinginsky District